N-Chlorosuccinimide ("NCS")is the organic compound with the formula C2H4(CO)2NCl.  A white solid, it is used for chlorinations. It is also used as a mild oxidant.  NCS is related to succinimide, but with NCl in place of NH.  The N–Cl bond is highly reactive, and NCS functions as a source of "Cl+".

Synthesis and selected reactions
NCS is produced from succinimide by treatment with Cl+ sources, such as bleach (sodium hypochlorite), and t-butylhypochlorite, and even chlorine.

Electron-rich arenes are readily monochlorinated by NCS.  Aniline and mesitylene are converted to the respective chlorinated derivatives.

Related reagents
 N-Iodosuccinimide (NIS), the iodine analog of N-chlorosuccinimide.
 N-bromosuccinimide (NBS), the bromine analog of N-chlorosuccinimide.
 Other N-chloro compounds that are commercially available include chloramine-T,  trichloroisocyanuric acid ((OCNCl)3), 1,3-dichloro-5,5-dimethylhydantoin.

Further reading

References

External links
N-Chlorosuccinimide and N-Iodosuccinimide at Organic Chemistry Portal

Reagents for organic chemistry
Oxidizing agents
Succinimides
Nitrogen–halogen compounds